Hypenula is a genus of litter moths of the family Erebidae. The genus was erected by Augustus Radcliffe Grote in 1876.

Species
Hypenula cacuminalis (Walker, 1859) – long-horned owlet moth
Hypenula caminalis Smith, 1905
Hypenula complectalis (Guenee, 1854)
Hypenula deleona Schaus, 1916
Hypenula miriam Schaus, 1916

References

Herminiinae
Moth genera